The 2013–14 First Women's Basketball League of Serbia was the 8th season of the First Women's Basketball League of Serbia, the highest professional basketball league in Serbia. It was also 70th national championship played by Serbian clubs inclusive of nation's previous incarnations as Yugoslavia and Serbia and Montenegro.

The first half of the season consisted of 14 teams and 182-game regular season (26 games for each of the 14 teams). It began Saturday, October 5, 2013 and ended Tuesday, April 15, 2014. The second half of the season consisted of four teams that play a playoff.

The playoff included the top four teams from the First Women's Basketball League of Serbia and ran from 16 April 2014 to 10 May 2014. Radivoj Korać won the championship.

Team information

Regular season
The season was played with 14 teams and a dual circuit system, each with each one game at home and away. The four best teams at the end of the regular season were placed in the playoff. The regular season began 5 October 2013 and ended 15 April 2014.

Playoff
The playoff was according to the cup system. The semifinals was played on 2 wins, in the final at 3 wins. The playoffs lasted from 16 April 2014 to 10 May 2014.

Awards
Finals MVP: Aleksandra Crvendakić (188-F-96) of Crvena zvezda
Player of the Year: Adrijana Knežević (183-F-87) of Spartak Subotica
Point Guard of the Year: Jovana Popović (173-PG-90) of Partizan
Power Forward of the Year: Adrijana Knežević (183-F-87) of Spartak Subotica
Center of the Year: Emina Demirović (186-C-85) of Vrbas
Coach of the Year: Miloš Pavlović of Radivoj Korać

1st Team
PG: Jovana Popović (173-PG-90) of Partizan
G: Biljana Stanković (177-G-74) of Radivoj Korać
F: Adrijana Knežević (183-F-87) of Spartak Subotica
F: Jelena Mitić (188-F-89) of Jagodina 2001
C: Emina Demirović (186-C-85) of Vrbas

2nd Team
G: Jovana Pašić (178-G-92) of Partizan
G: Aleksandra Katić (172-G-87) of Radnički Kragujevac
F: Aleksandra Crvendakić (188-F-96) of Crvena zvezda
C/F: Ivanka Matić (193-C/F-79) of Crvena zvezda
C: Nikolina Milić (191-C-94) of Radivoj Korać

3rd Team
G: Dunja Prčić (180-G-87) of Partizan
F/G: Jovana Jakšić (178-F/G-92) of Vršac
F/C: Tina Jovanović (190-F/C-91) of Crvena zvezda
F/C: Ivana Grubor (185-F/C-84) of Jagodina 2001
C: Jelena Maksimović (192-C-82) of Radivoj Korać

Honorable Mention
Dara Kovačević (197-C-83) of Srbobran
Jelena Antić (187-SF-91) of Radivoj Korać
Aleksandra Dobrović (184-C-93) of Vršac
Aleksandra Račić (181-G-90) of Šumadija Kragujevac
Mirjana Velisavljević (188-C-78) of Šabac
Emeše Vida (188-F/C-93) of Spartak Subotica
Sonja Marić (185-F-85) of Srbobran
Bojana Janković (184-F-83) of Partizan

External links
 First Basketball Women's League of Serbia at eurobasket.com
 First Basketball Women's League of Serbia at srbijasport.net

First Women's Basketball League of Serbia seasons
Serbia
women